Oothikachiya Ponnu is 1981 Indian Malayalam-language film directed by P. K. Joseph and written by V. K. Pavithran. The film reunited Mohanlal, Shanker and Poornima Jayaram after Manjil Virinja Pookkal (1980); it also features Mammootty.

Plot

A poor young woman must succeed in her dream as a saleswoman.

Cast
Poornima Jayaram as Sukumari
Shankar as Vishwanathan
Mohanlal as Nandan
K. P. Ummer as Mathachan
Mammootty as Thoman Kutty
Santhakumari as Sukumari's mother
Sreenath as Dr. Samuel
Nellikode Bhaskaran as Sukumari's father
Roja Ramani as Shalini
Jagathi Sreekumar as Vasu
Indrapani
Master Kumar
Suchitra

Soundtrack
The music was composed by M. K. Arjunan with lyrics by Poovachal Khader.

References

External links
 

1981 films
1980s Malayalam-language films
1980s romance films
Indian romance films